Jeopardy! is an American television game show.

Jeopardy may also refer to:

Film and television
 Jeopardy! (franchise), media franchise that began with a television quiz show
 Jeopardy! (British game show), a British adaptation of the American game show
 Jeopardy (film), a 1953 film starring Barbara Stanwyck and Ralph Meeker
 Jeopardy (TV series), a dramatic BBC TV series
 "Jeopardy" (NCIS), an episode of NCIS

Music
 Jeopardy (album), a 1980 album by the Sound
 "Jeopardy" (song), a 1983 song by the Greg Kihn Band
"Jeopardy", a song from Run the Jewels 2, by Run the Jewels

Other uses
 Jeopardy (legal topic) or double jeopardy
 "In jeopardy", a baseball term for a baserunner who is not safely on base

See also

 Endangerment (disambiguation)
 Risk
 Peril